Rice-A-Roni is a pilaf-like boxed food mix that consists of rice, vermicelli pasta, and seasonings. To prepare, the rice and pasta are browned in butter, then water and seasonings are added and simmered until absorbed. It is a product of Quaker Oats Company, a subsidiary of PepsiCo.

History
In 1890, Italian-born immigrant Domenico DeDomenico moved to California, where he established a fresh produce store. A successful businessman, he married Maria Ferrigno from Salerno, Italy. Back home, her family owned a pasta factory, so in 1912 she persuaded him to establish a similar business in the Mission District of San Francisco. The enterprise was "Gragnano Products, Inc." It delivered pasta to Italian stores and restaurants in the area.

DeDomenico's sons, Paskey, Vince (1915–2007), Tom, and Anthony, worked with him. In 1934, Paskey changed the name to "Golden Grain Macaroni Company". Tom's wife, Lois, was inspired by the pilaf recipe she received from Armenian immigrant Pailadzo Captanian, to create a dish of rice and macaroni, which she served at a family dinner. In 1958, Vince invented Rice-A-Roni by adding a dry chicken soup mix to rice and macaroni. It was introduced in 1958 in the Northwestern United States and went nationwide four years later. Because of its origins, it was called "The San Francisco Treat!".

After a trip to Italy in 1964, Vince returned with the idea for "Noodle Roni Parmesano", based on the classic Noodles Alfredo.  As the product line extended with other shapes and sauces it was renamed from Noodle Roni to Pasta Roni in 1995. In 1986, Quaker Oats Company purchased the Golden Grain Company from the DeDomenico family. In 2001, the Quaker Oats Company was purchased by PepsiCo.

American Italian Pasta Company bought the Golden Grain brand in 2003, but the sale did not include Rice-a-Roni, which remained with the Quaker Oats division of PepsiCo.

Rice-a-Roni is marketing low-sodium versions of its primary products.  The company has marketed a line of products with brown rice.

See also 

 Reissa roni, an insect named after the product

References

Further reading
 Birth of Rice-A-Roni: The Armenian-Italian Treat reported by National Public Radio on Morning Edition

External links

 Explanation of the name and the slogan "The San Francisco Treat" at The Straight Dope
 Consumer Reports

Quaker Oats Company brands
Products introduced in 1958
Rice dishes
Food and drink in the San Francisco Bay Area
Mission District, San Francisco
Food and drink companies based in California